Saint-Boniface is a municipality in the Mauricie region of the province of Quebec in Canada.

On April 5, 2003, the village municipality of Saint-Boniface-de-Shawinigan changed its legal status and its name and became the municipality of Saint-Boniface.

Demographics
Population trend:
 Population in 2021: 5156 (2016 to 2021 population change: 6.7%)
 Population in 2016: 4832
 Population in 2011: 4511
 Population in 2006: 4180
 Population in 2001: 3998
 Population in 1996: 3998
 Population in 1991: 3813

Private dwellings occupied by usual residents: 2098 (total dwellings: 2205)

Mother tongue:
 English as first language: 1%
 French as first language: 98.8%
 English and French as first language: 0%
 Other as first language: 0.2%

References

External links

 Official Website (French only)
 Official Facebook page of the Municipal Library of Saint-Boniface (French only)

Incorporated places in Mauricie
Municipalities in Quebec